One More for the Road is a studio album by the American blues musician Charles Brown. It was released in 1986 through Blue Side Records, and rereleased in 1989 through Alligator Records. It was regarded as a comeback album for Brown, who had been out of the spotlight for decades.

Production
Nine tracks are shared between the Blue Side and Alligator releases, while two tracks are exclusive to each album. Bruce Iglauer determined the Alligator track listing.

Critical reception

The Chicago Tribune called the album "a unique treat, a modern album with the style and patina of an earlier time," writing that "Brown`s piano is hauntingly supported by the fine back work of guitarist Billy Butler." Robert Christgau wrote that Brown's "voice slips into the lugubrious so reflexively that at times you suspect clutch problems with the master reel, and it could just be that he's best appreciated over a highball—or else, like so many chart-toppers before him, in three-minute doses." The Edmonton Journal thought that "the music takes a much more intricate exploration of melody than a straight forward blues album would."

Track listing

Personnel
Charles Brown - piano
Billy Butler - guitar
Earl May - bass
Harold Ousley - saxophone
Kenny Washington - drums

References

Alligator Records albums